Jennifer Adriano Arias (born May 25, 1972), better known by her stage names Rosanna Roces and Osang, is a Filipina actress.

Career
Roces was a contract star of Seiko Films from 1994 to 1996, introduced initially as "Ana Maceda". After her years with Seiko, she appeared in the film Ligaya Ang Itawag Mo Sa Akin by Reyna Films, which paved the way for her transition to "serious acting".

Roces ventured into hosting by serving as a replacement for Dawn Zulueta on GMA Network's Startalk. Roces hosted the show until 2004, after a misunderstanding between her and her manager-friend Lolit Solis. She left GMA Network for ABS-CBN. Roces also acted on TV, appearing in shows such as 1 for 3 with Vic Sotto and Charlene Gonzales from 1997 to 2001 and Daboy en Da Girl with Rudy Fernandez from 2002 to 2003.

She was also part of ABS-CBN's Sineserye Presents: Natutulog Ba Ang Diyos? as Patria and appeared in the soap opera Ysabella as Rosario, and Maging Sino Ka Man: Ang Pagbabalik as Veronica Rubio. She also appeared in the finale episode of Tayong Dalawa on September 25, 2009, on ABS-CBN.

In January 2010, MTRCB suspended It's Showtime after Roces‘ insensitive comments about the teachers as “repeaters”. It's Showtime was given a 20-day preventive suspension by the board. Roces was removed as a judge of the show by ABS-CBN on January 8, 2010, as part of the network's self-regulation.

Filmography

Film
{| class="wikitable sortable" style="font-size: 95%;"
|- 
! Year !! Title !! Role !! Ref.
|-
| 1992 || Comfort Women: A Cry for Justice || Ana Maceda ||
|-
| 1994 || Machete II || Margarita ||
|-
| 1995 || Kirot 2 || Olga ||
|-
| 1995 || Kandungan || ||
|-
| 1995 || Di Mapigil Ang Init || Jenny ||
|-
| 1996 || Patikim ng Pinya || Myra ||
|-
| 1996 || Nagbabagang Labi || ||
|-
| 1996 || Ligaya Ang Itawag Mo Sa Akin || ||
|- 
| 1997 || Pusakal || ||
|-
| 1997 || Selosa || ||
|-
| 1997 || Nang Mamulat Si Eba, Part 2 || ||
|-
| 1997 || Matrikula || ||
|-
| 1997 || Yes Darling Walang Matigas na Pulis Part 2 || ||
|-
| 1997 || Ang Lalaki Sa Buhay Ni Selya || Selya ||
|-
| 1998 || Kahit Pader, Gigibain Ko || Sandy Galang ||
|-
| 1998 || Mapusok || ||
|-
| 1998 || Curacha, Ang Babaing Walang Pahinga || Curacha/Corazon ||
|-
| 1998 || Cariño Brutal || ||
|-
| 1998 || Ginto't Pilak || ||
|-
| 1998 || Ang Babae Sa Bintana || Jack ||
|-
| 1999 || Katawan || ||
|-
| 1999 || Ms. Kristina Moran, Ang Babaeng Palaban || Kristina Moran ||
|-
| 1999 || Basta't Ikaw Nangingining Pa || ||
|-
| 2001 || La Vida Rosa || Rosa ||
|-
| 2008 || Aurora || ||
|-
| 2008 || Karera || ||
|-
| 2009 || Pasang Krus || ||
|-
| 2009 || Manila || Juliana ||
|-
| 2009 || Wanted: Border || Mama Saleng ||
|-
| 2009 || Baklas || ||
|-
| 2010 || Romeo at Juliet || ||
|-
| 2010 || Presa || ||
|-
| 2011 || Fable of the Fish || ||
|-
| 2011 || Haruo || ||
|-
| 2012 || My Cactus Heart || Margaret ||
|-
| 2013 || Mater Dolorosa || ||
|-
| 2013 || On the Job || ||
|-
| 2013 || Hustisya || Divina ||
|-
| 2014 || Kinabukasan || Sam ||
|-
| 2016 || Padre de Familia || Ramona Santiago ||
|-
| 2017 || Dark Is the Night || ||
|-
| 2018 || Hitboy || ||
|-
| 2019 || The Panti Sisters || Vilma Panti ||
|-
| 2019 || The Man, The Woman, and The Other Woman || ||
|-
| 2020 || Suarez: The Healing Priest || ||
|-
| 2021 || Paglaki Ko, Gusto Kong Maging Pornstar || ||
|-
| 2021 || Anak ng Macho Dancer || Tere ||
|}

Television

Awards and nominations
Cinema One Originals Digital Film Festival

Metro Manila Film Festival

FAMAS (Filipino Academy of Movie Arts and Sciences Awards)

Gawad Urian (Manunuri ng Pelikulang Pilipino)

 Tied with Assunta de Rossi''.

References

External links
 

Living people
Filipino film actresses
Filipino television actresses
People from Quezon City
Actresses from Metro Manila
20th-century Filipino actresses
21st-century Filipino actresses
Viva Artists Agency
GMA Network personalities
ABS-CBN personalities
1972 births